Andy Cohen is an American architect and co-CEO of Gensler, the largest architecture and design firm by revenue, leading the international company with co-CEO Diane Hoskins since 2005. He is a fellow of the American Institute of Architects, a registered architect in 41 states, and member of the International Interior Design Association. He is also on the Gensler board of directors.

Early life and education 
Cohen was born in Lynbrook, a town in Nassau County, New York. He attended Lynbrook High School and earned a Bachelor of Arts in architecture with a concentration in sustainable design from Pratt Institute. Cohen's family owned a dairy store, Cohen's Dairy, on the Lower East Side of Manhattan. He was expected to run the family store, however, a passion for design led him to pursue architecture.

Career 
Cohen joined Gensler in 1980 as a designer focused on sustainability. He opened new practice areas for the firm including global aviation and transportation, as well as entertainment.

Projects 
Cohen has worked on a number of buildings including The Ritz-Carlton Hotel and Residences at L.A. Live and the Shanghai Tower, which is the world's second tallest building. He is regularly published and quoted in the media on topics related to sustainability, the future of work, leadership, urban mobility, parking, and transportation.

References

Living people
Year of birth missing (living people)
Place of birth missing (living people)
21st-century American architects
Fellows of the American Institute of Architects
American chief executives
American corporate directors